MV Eynhallow is a Ro-Ro vehicle ferry operated by Orkney Ferries.

History
MV Eynhallow was built by Abels Shipbuilders in Bristol in 1987.

Service
MV Eynhallow is normally used on the Rousay, Egilsay and Wyre service.

References

1987 ships
Transport in Orkney
Ferries of Scotland
Ships built in Bristol